A by-election was held for the New South Wales Legislative Assembly electorate of Newcastle on 12 October 1889 because of the resignation of William Grahame who had financial difficulties.

Dates

Results

William Grahame resigned due to financial difficulties.

See also
Electoral results for the district of Newcastle
List of New South Wales state by-elections

References

New South Wales state by-elections
1889 elections in Australia
1890s in New South Wales